Václav Bolemír Nebeský (18 August 1818 – 17 August 1882) was a Czech poet active during Czech National Revival.

Biography 
Václav Bolemír Nebeský was born at the Nový Dvůr estate in the neighbourhood of Kokořín. He went to high school in Litoměřice. He learned Greek and Latin very well there and this ability helped him to become a translator much later. Then he studied at Charles University of Prague. After 1820 he chose to take the typically Czech name of Bolemír. He spent four years in Vienna, where he worked as a private teacher. When he returned to Prague he continued to be a private educator and he worked for the president of the Czech Museum. He cooperated with other important figures of national revival, among others with Boleslav Jablonský, Josef Kajetán Tyl, Karel Jaromír Erben, Karel Havlíček Borovský and Karel Sabina. He was also with intimate relation with famous writer Božena Němcová. He was active during revolution of 1848, known commonly as Spring of Nations. He was elected a deputy at the Austrian Parliament. In 1849 he got tenure at the University but never lectured. Worked as a journalist. Václav Bolemír Nebeský died in Prague in 1882. He has been buried at the Vyšehrad cemetery in Prague

Works 
Václav Bolemír Nebeský was a poet and translator. His best-known work is the poem is Protichůdci. The title means "The men, who go in opposite directions". It was published in 1844. The main hero is the Wandering Jew, Ahasver. He is a man weary of life, who longs for death. The hero is probably a symbol of everyone's endeavour and suffering. The poem is written in trochaic pentameter. Nebeský translated many works by ancient authors, for example Aristophanes, Aischylos, Terence and Plautus. He also published anthologies of Jewish legends in 1881.

References

External links 
 Protichůdci. Báseň od Václ. Bol. Nebeského, Tisk a sklad Jar. Pospíšila, Praha 1844. 
 Original poems and translations by Václav Bolemír Nebeský at Czech Wikisource.

1818 births
1882 deaths
People from Mělník District
People from the Kingdom of Bohemia
Old Czech Party politicians
Members of the Imperial Diet (Austria)
Czech poets
Czech translators
Translators from Greek
Translators from Latin
Burials at Vyšehrad Cemetery
Charles University alumni